Luis Michael Dörrbecker Rebollar (Gifhorn, Germany, 9 January 1993) is a Mexican racing driver.

Career
Dörrbecker started his racing career in 2003, when he was fifteenth in the Super Karts Cup México. In both 2005 and 2006 he won the championship. Furthermore, in 2007 he won the NACAM Formula Kart Rotax Championship Latin America.

2008 saw Dörrbecker's debut in formula racing, coming fourth in the Formula Vee Mexico. He was then second in the Skip Barber Southern Regional Series, held during the winter. In 2009, he got to the twenty-third position in the LATAM Challenge Series, which used Formula Renault cars. He also entered four races of the Skip Barber National Championship, finishing sixth, eighth, seventh and sixth.

In 2010, Dörrbecker started racing in Europe, when he entered two races in Formula Renault 2.0 Italia. Later that year, he drove six races in the Skip Barber National, winning one of them. In 2011, he finished ninth in the FR 2.0 Italia and in 2012, he drove eight races in the Formula Renault 2.0 Alps, but only scored two points. However, he did test the Indy Lights car at Indianapolis later that year.

He then entered the Formula ACI/CSAI Abarth Italian Championship in 2013, finishing on the podium once and seventh in the championship. In 2014, Dörrbecker raced for Team Mexico in Formula Acceleration 1. After eight races, he placed in the championship.

Dörrbecker entered the first three rounds of the 2015 Euroformula Open Championship, scoring a point. In 2016 he entered the first round of the Auto GP, winning both races. Later he joined the Formula class of the BOSS GP Series also with a Lola B05/52, scoring a win and three overall podiums.

Racing record

Racing career summary 

† As Dörrbecker was a guest driver, he was ineligible to score points.

Complete GT World Challenge Europe results

GT World Challenge Europe Endurance Cup 
(Races in bold indicate pole position) (Races in italics indicate fastest lap)

References 

1993 births
Living people
People from Gifhorn
Mexican racing drivers
LATAM Challenge Series drivers
Formula Abarth drivers
Formula Renault 2.0 Alps drivers
Auto GP drivers
Euroformula Open Championship drivers
De Villota Motorsport drivers
Euronova Racing drivers
FIA Motorsport Games drivers
Lamborghini Super Trofeo drivers
Racing drivers from Lower Saxony